The 1967 Western Michigan Broncos football team represented Western Michigan University in the Mid-American Conference (MAC) during the 1967 NCAA University Division football season.  In their fourth season under head coach Bill Doolittle, the Broncos compiled a 5–4 record (4–2 against MAC opponents), finished in a tie for third place in the MAC, and were outscored by their opponents, 164 to 156.  The team played its home games at Waldo Stadium in Kalamazoo, Michigan.

The team's statistical leaders included Jim Boreland with 1,113 passing yards, Jack Foster with 497 rushing yards, and Marty Barski with 653 receiving yards. Halfback Bill Devine and linebacker Orv Schneider were the team captains. Split Marty Barski received the team's most outstanding player award.

Schedule

References

Western Michigan
Western Michigan Broncos football seasons
Western Michigan Broncos football